Yotholín is a town located in the Ticul Municipality, Yucatán in Mexico.

References

Populated places in Yucatán